Elizabeth "Betty" Duvall Webb (1845 – July 3, 1891) was a Confederate spy during the American Civil War.

Biography
Elizabeth "Betty" Duvall was from Washington, D.C. She was the daughter of Eli Duvall Sr. and Sarah (née Thompson) Duvall. She was descended from the immigrant Mareen Duvall.

Washington D.C.-based spy Rose O'Neal Greenhow gave her a note about a Union plan for the first Battle of Manassas (or Bull Run) to give to General P. G. T. Beauregard; Duvall carried it tucked in her hair. She continued to be a spy, and for one of her missions she brought her cousin.

She married John Converse Webb. They had three children.

She died on July 3, 1891. She was buried at Oak Hill Cemetery in Washington, D.C.

References

External links

American people of French descent
1845 births
1891 deaths
Betty
Female wartime spies
Women in the American Civil War
People from Washington, D.C.
American Civil War spies
Burials at Oak Hill Cemetery (Washington, D.C.)